The Martinique Channel is a strait in the Caribbean Sea that separates Saint Vincent and the Grenadines from Grenada.

See also 
 Martinique
 Grenadines
 Carriacou and Petite Martinique
 Palm Island, Grenadines

References

International straits
Straits of the Caribbean
Grenada–Saint Vincent and the Grenadines border